Shaunaka is the name applied to teachers, and to a Shakha of the Atharvaveda. He is claimed as the teacher of Katyayana and especially of Ashvalayana, and is said to have united the Bashkala and Shakala Shakhas of the Rigveda. In legend, he is sometimes identified with Gritsamada, a Vedic rishi.

Literature 
According to the Vishnu Purana, Shaunaka was the son of Gritsamada and invented the system of the four levels of human life. Sūta mahamuni narrated mythological stories to a group of sages headed by Shaunaka maha muni.

 is attributed to Shaunaka who taught it to others in a satra-yajna (a 12-day very large scale collective yajna) held in Naimisha according to Vishnumitra of Champa town, the commentator of 's commentary of 

Shaunaka had a prominent role in the epic Mahābhārata. The epic Mahābhārata was narrated to Shaunaka by a storyteller named Ugrasrava Sauti during a conclave of sages headed by Shaunaka in a forest named Naimisha.

See also

 Gritsamada
 Bhargava
 Bhrigu

References

External links

 Titles and occupations in Hinduism
 Ancient Sanskrit grammarians
 Characters in the Mahabharata
Gurus and saints